Daniel Rossi (died 1538) was a Roman Catholic prelate who served as Bishop of Caorle (1513–1538).

Biography
On 9 May 1513, Daniel Rossi was appointed during the papacy of Pope Leo X as Bishop of Caorle.
He served as Bishop of Caorle until his death in 1538.

References

External links and additional sources
 (for Chronology of Bishops)
 (for Chronology of Bishops)

16th-century Italian Roman Catholic bishops
Bishops appointed by Pope Leo X
1538 deaths